Manoff is a surname. Notable people with the surname include:

 Arnold Manoff (1914-1965), American screenwriter
 Dinah Manoff (born 1958), American actor

See also
 Madoff (surname)